Marziano Magnani (14 June 1936 – 11 November 1983) was an Italian wrestler. He competed in the men's Greco-Roman middleweight at the 1960 Summer Olympics. Magnani was also a four-time national champion in the 1960s and 1970s.

References

External links
 

1936 births
1983 deaths
Italian male sport wrestlers
Olympic wrestlers of Italy
Wrestlers at the 1960 Summer Olympics
Sportspeople from Bologna
20th-century Italian people